James Mitchell Ellis Garrow (20 October 1865 – 7 October 1935) was a New Zealand teacher, industrial advocate, university registrar, lawyer and university professor. He was born in Banff, Banffshire, Scotland, on 20 October 1865.

References

1865 births
1935 deaths
New Zealand educators
19th-century New Zealand lawyers
New Zealand academics
People from Banff, Aberdeenshire